Intimacy is an album by worship artist Matt Redman. It was released in the US as The Heart of Worship with a very similar cover.

The album was recorded at various locations
Shine Studios, London, England - (Engineer Trevor Michael)
ICC Studios, Eastbourne, England - (Engineer Trevor Michael)
Warehouse Studio, Oxford, England - (Engineer Steve Watkins)
The Matinee, Nashville, Tennessee - (Engineer Matt Huesmann) for the Gospel Choir
Northwind Studio, Natal - (Engineer Nick Fairclogh) for the Zulu Choir

Track listing
All songs written by Matt Redman, except where noted.

 Disc - Total Time 61:25
 "Let Everything That Has Breath" – 6:32
 "One Thing Remains" – 5:02
 "What I Have Vowed" – 4:57
 "Intimacy" – 4:34
 "Hear The Music of My Heart" – 5:00
 "When I Needed A Saviour" – 4:32
 "I Am Yours" – 4:08
 "The Heart of Worship" – 5:20
 "Now To Live The Life" – 5:06
 "For The Cross" (Matt Redman, Beth Vickers) – 4:24
 "Hallelujah Song" – 5:51
 "The Prayers of The Saints" – 7:59

Personnel 
 Matt Redman – lead vocals, acoustic guitars
 Steve Cantellow – keyboards
 Mark Edwards – keyboards
 Zarc Porter – programming
 Dave Clifton – acoustic guitars, electric guitars, backing vocals
 Martin Smith – acoustic guitars, lead and backing vocals (8)
 Dan Boreham – electric guitars
 Craig Borlase – electric guitars
 John Ellis – electric guitars
 Stuart Garrard – electric guitars
 Phil Barker – bass
 Matt Weeks – bass
 Terl Bryant – drums
 Phil Crabbe – drums
 Nathan Fellingham – drums
 Colin Brooks – percussion
 The Psalm Drummers – percussion (1, 11):
 Chip Bailey
 Kevin Bonnett
 Terl Bryant
 Mark Jones
 Phil Manning
 Bruce Pont
 Calum Rees
 Dan Weeks
 Peter Whitfield – strings
 Simon Lockyer – strings
 Craig McCleish – string arrangements 
 Andrew Phillip – arrangements
 Chris Eaton – backing vocals
 Elaine Hanley – backing vocals
 Kaz Lewis – backing vocals
 Mal Pope – backing vocals
 Beth Vickers – backing vocals
 Zulu Choir (Inanda, South Africa)
 Gospel Choir: 
 Ann Bailey
 Steve Flanigan
 Nicole C. Mullen
 George "Teddy" Pendergrass
 Scat Springs
 Roz Thompson
 Eddie Wakes

Production 
 Andy Piercy – producer 
 John Mays – executive producer 
 Les Moir – executive producer 
 Colin Walker – engineer 
 Nick Fairclough – recording (Zulu choir)
 Matt Huessman – recording (gospel choir)
 Trevor Michael – recording 
 Curtis Schwartz – recording, mixing
 Steve Watkins – recording 
 Steve Bishir – mixing 
 Hank Nirider – mix assistant 
 Chris Blair – mastering 
 Christiév Carothers – creative direction 
 Jan Cook – art direction 
 Karen Philpott – design 
 Daniel Swallow – photography 
 Julia Clancy – photography assistant 
 Sarah Gottschalk – photography assistant

Release details
1998, UK, Survivor Records SURCD008, Release Date ? ? 1998, CD (originally released with bonus sampler CD)
1999, USA, Star Song ?, Release Date ? ? 1999, CD (released under the title "The Heart of Worship")
2003, UK, Survivor Records SURCD092, Release Date 21 Mar 2003, CD (double CD with "The Friendship And The Fear")

References

1998 albums
Matt Redman albums
Survivor Records albums